Christopher Robert Fowler (26 March 1953 – 3 March 2023) was an English thriller writer. While working in the British film industry he became the author of fifty novels and short-story collections, including the Bryant & May mysteries, which record the adventures of two Golden Age detectives in modern-day London. His awards include the 2015 CWA Dagger in the Library (for his entire body of work), The Last Laugh Award (twice) and the British Fantasy Award (multiple times), the Edge Hill Prize and the inaugural Green Carnation Award. His other works include screenplays, video games, graphic novels, audio and stage plays.

Early life
Fowler was born in Greenwich, London.

Career
Before becoming a novelist, Fowler was a copywriter and film marketer; he wrote the tag-line for the 1979 sci-fi/horror movie Alien, "In space, no one can hear you scream".

Bryant & May mysteries

Fowler was best known as the author of the Bryant & May mysteries, in which the two detectives, Arthur Bryant and John May, are members of the fictional Peculiar Crimes Unit, based on a unit his father worked in during World War II.

The Bryant & May series is set primarily in London, with stories taking place in various years between World War II and the present. While there is a progressive narrative, the cases each stand alone as separate stories. The exceptions are Full Dark House, an origin story which focuses on May's reminiscence of the team's first case together during the Blitz; Seventy-Seven Clocks, framed as Bryant's retelling of a case from 1973; and On the Loose and Off the Rails, which continue characters and events across two books. Hall of Mirrors is set in 1969; at one point, the characters discuss the events of that summer: the Woodstock music festival, the Moon landing, and the Manson murders. There are two volumes of "missing cases" (short stories), London's Glory and England's Finest.

Fowler weaves many factual layers of London's history and society throughout the series. Most of the locations are recognisable London landmarks such as St Paul's Cathedral, the Tate Gallery and various theatres. A major feature of The Water Room is the network of tunnels and underground rivers underneath the city. In Off the Rails they explore the London Underground network.

There are many references to other literary works throughout the series. Seventy-Seven Clocks contains references to Gilbert and Sullivan throughout the narrative, while The Victoria Vanishes has deliberate similarities with The Moving Toyshop by Edmund Crispin. Although the books appear to have bizarre, uncanny elements, they are not in any way supernatural or fantastical. The unit in which they are set is based on real post-war London units.

The series is also available in audiobook format, narrated by Tim Goodman. Characters from this series also appear in Fowler's Roofworld, Rune, Darkest Day, and Soho Black, although these books are not considered part of the series.

Other novels and short stories
Fowler's book Rune is an update to a modern setting of the M. R. James story "Casting the Runes". It also features Bryant, May and several characters from that series.

His story "The Master Builder" was filmed as Through the Eyes of a Killer, starring Richard Dean Anderson, Marg Helgenberger and Tippi Hedren. His tenth short story collection, Old Devil Moon, won the Edge Hill Audience Prize 2008. His short story "Left Hand Drive" was made into a film that won Best British Short. His stories "On Edge" and "The Most Boring Woman in the World" were both filmed. His novella Breathe won the British Fantasy Society Award for best novella in 2005.

Put into different temporal settings, some elements of his original 2008 story "Arkangel" from Exotic Gothic 2 reappear in his 2012 frame-novel Hell Train (a book called "must read now!” by SciFiNow), including the Polish town of Chelmsk, the physical descriptions of its white gold-rivetted damnation train Arkangel and the town's yokels.

His memoir of a lonely 1960s childhood, Paperboy, won the inaugural Green Carnation prize, which celebrates fiction and memoirs written by gay men. A sequel, Film Freak, charted his travels through the British film industry. His collection Red Gloves consisted of 25 new stories marking a quarter-century in print, two graphic novels and a Hammer horror radio play. He also wrote a Sherlock Holmes audio drama for BBC 7 entitled The Lady Downstairs and the War of the Worlds videogame with Sir Patrick Stewart, for Paramount. He was at work on a new thriller, Summer Dies, and a complete collection of his short stories from 1985 to the present.

Further works include:
 Nyctophobia (2014) Solaris Books , a haunted house novel set in bright daylight about a woman who is terrified of the dark
 The Casebook of Bryant & May, a graphic novel illustrated by Keith Page
 Menz Insana, a graphic novel illustrated by John Bolton

Forgotten Authors series
Fowler wrote a periodic column for The Independent titled Invisible Ink. In this series, he looked at a wide range of writers whose works, once popular, have now fallen out of the public eye. His book version, The Book of Forgotten Authors, is published by Quercus.

Personal life and death
Fowler lived in Barcelona and King's Cross, London. His husband, Peter, was a TV executive. 

Fowler was diagnosed with cancer in March 2020, which he announced on his blog the following April. He died in London on 3 March 2023, at the age of 69.

Novels and collections

See also
List of horror fiction writers

References

External links
Christopher Fowler's website
BBC Sherlock Holmes site Short story by Christopher Fowler — The Lady Downstairs
Story behind Plastic - Online essay written by Fowler
The story behind The Bleeding Heart - Online essay written by Fowler

1953 births
2023 deaths
20th-century English novelists
21st-century English novelists
Deaths from cancer in England
English LGBT novelists
English expatriates in Spain
English horror writers
English male novelists
English thriller writers
People from Greenwich
Writers from London